Delta Connection is a regional airline brand name for Delta Air Lines, under which a number of individually owned regional airlines primarily operate short- and medium-haul routes. Mainline major air carriers often use regional airlines to operate services via code sharing agreements in order to increase frequencies in addition to serving routes that would not sustain larger aircraft as well as for other competitive or operational reasons.

Delta Connection flights are operated by Delta-owned Endeavor Air and contractors Republic Airways and SkyWest Airlines.

History

Delta Connection was founded in 1984 as a means of expanding the Delta network to smaller markets via partnerships with regional airlines. Atlantic Southeast Airlines (ASA) began Delta Connection service on March 1, 1984, from their hub in Atlanta, and soon had a substantial presence at the Dallas/Fort Worth International Airport. ASA was a wholly owned subsidiary of Delta Air Lines under the Delta Connection, Inc., holding company from May 11, 1999, to September 7, 2005, when it was purchased by SkyWest, Inc., the parent company of SkyWest Airlines.

Ransome Airlines operated Delta Connection flights from March 1, 1984, to June 1, 1986, when it was purchased by Pan Am. Comair began Delta Connection service on September 1, 1984. In January 2000, Comair became a wholly owned subsidiary of Delta Air Lines. Rio Airways operated Delta Connection flights from their hub in Dallas/Fort Worth from June 1, 1984, to December 14, 1986, when the airline declared bankruptcy. Business Express Airlines operated Delta Connection flights in the northeastern US and Canada from June 1, 1986, to March 15, 2000. The company was purchased by AMR Corporation in 1999 and integrated into the American Eagle Airlines system in 2000. Following the acquisition of Western Airlines by Delta Air Lines, SkyWest Airlines, which had been operating codeshare service flying as Western Express for Western, became a Delta Connection carrier on April 1, 1987. Trans States Airlines operated Delta Connection flights from March 1998 to March 31, 2000, mainly from their focus cities in Boston and New York.

On November 2, 2004, Atlantic Coast Airlines ended service as a Delta Connection Carrier. Atlantic Coast Airlines reinvented itself as a low fare carrier called Independence Air, based at Washington Dulles International Airport. Atlantic Coast Airlines operated over 30 Dornier 328JET aircraft as part of its Delta Connection service from 2000 until 2005.

On December 22, 2004, Delta Air Lines announced that Republic Airways would order and operate 16 Embraer E170 aircraft under the Delta Connection banner. Since then, it has been announced that the Republic Airways subsidiary Shuttle America would operate the flights. The initial flight took place on September 1, 2005. On May 4, 2005, Delta Air Lines announced that Mesa Air Group subsidiary Freedom Airlines would operate up to 30 Bombardier CRJ-200 aircraft under the Delta Connection banner beginning in October 2005. Shortly after the announcement, the decision was made for Freedom Airlines to operate the Embraer ERJ-145 for Delta Connection instead of the CRJ. After a legal battle with Mesa Air Group, Delta and Freedom Airlines terminated their contract, ending all flights on August 31, 2010. On December 21, 2006, Delta announced that Big Sky Airlines would become a Delta Connection carrier, using eight Beechcraft 1900D turboprops out of Boston Logan International Airport.

On March 1, 2007, it was announced that ExpressJet would operate 10 Embraer ERJ-145XR aircraft under the Delta Connection banner beginning in June 2007 on flights from Los Angeles International Airport. It was later announced that ExpressJet would operate an additional eight aircraft as Delta Connection. On July 3, 2008, Delta and ExpressJet announced that they had terminated their agreement and that ExpressJet operations as Delta Connection would end by September 1, 2008. On April 30, 2007, it was announced that Pinnacle Airlines would operate 16 Bombardier CRJ-900 under the Delta Connection banner starting in December 2007.

Merging Delta Connection and Northwest Airlink
The merger of Delta Air Lines and Northwest Airlines meant that Northwest's regional brand, Northwest Airlink, would be merged into Delta Connection. The new Delta Connection would include the regional airlines from both the original Delta and Northwest. On November 8, 2008, Delta and Mesaba Airlines, a fully owned regional subsidiary of Northwest Airlines that operated flights as Northwest Airlink with turboprop aircraft and also with regional jet aircraft, announced that the seven CRJ-900 aircraft previously operated by Freedom as well as eight new-order aircraft would be operated for Delta Connection beginning February 12, 2009.

Citing cost reductions, Delta Air Lines sold former Northwest Airlines regional subsidiary Mesaba Airlines on July 1, 2010, to Pinnacle Airlines Corp. for $62 million. Its headquarters were moved to Pinnacle's in Memphis on December 26, 2011. Mesaba merged its operations into Pinnacle on January 4, 2012. The same day, Trans States Holdings purchased Compass Airlines from Delta for $20.5 million. It has maintained both regional operations with the airlines as of January 1, 2012.

Delta announced that it would add in-flight WiFi to 223 Delta Connection aircraft beginning in 2011.

Regional carrier GoJet Airlines, also owned by Trans States Holdings, began operations from Detroit Wayne County Metropolitan Airport to cities in the Midwest using 15 CRJ-700 aircraft on January 11, 2012.

Following a merger between Atlantic Southeast Airlines (ASA) and ExpressJet, Delta Connection flights operated under the latter's name and ceased operations as ASA.  All routes remained the same, but the flights began operating as ExpressJet beginning in 2012.

On July 25, 2012, Delta announced that its wholly owned subsidiary Comair would cease all operations at midnight on September 28, 2012.

On May 1, 2013, as a condition of exiting bankruptcy, Pinnacle Airlines became a subsidiary of Delta and was subsequently renamed Endeavor Air.

On December 31, 2014, Chautauqua Airlines operated its last flight for Delta Connection. All aircraft and crew and maintenance bases would be absorbed by the Shuttle America certificate. The conclusion of this service also removed the last operating three seat wide aircraft from the Delta Connection fleet.

On August 9, 2017, it was announced that Delta and ExpressJet would terminate their agreement early with all operations ended in late 2018. The remaining dual-class aircraft financed by Delta would be transferred to Endeavor while ExpressJet would redistribute their financed aircraft to other flying partners. Delta cited ExpressJet's lacking operational performance and focus on trimming their 50-seat fleet as the main reason for terminating the contract early.

In August 2019, Delta announced that the regional fleet would be consolidated from 5 carriers to 3, eliminating GoJet Airlines and Compass Airlines. The Delta Connection aircraft and routes would be transferred to the Delta-owned Endeavor Air and contractors Republic Airway and SkyWest Airlines. Endeavor, Republic, and SkyWest would each focus on different geographic regions with SkyWest becoming the primary partner in Los Angeles, Salt Lake City, and Seattle; and Endeavor growing in Cincinnati, Detroit, and Raleigh–Durham.

In September 2020, Delta announced in an SEC filing that it planned to retire all Delta-owned CRJ200 aircraft by December 2023.

Destinations

Operators and fleet

Fleet 

A scope clause agreement between Delta Air Lines and its mainline pilots union limits the number and size of aircraft that may be flown by Delta Connection. The current agreement allows up to 125 airplanes with 50 seats or fewer, 102 airplanes with between 51 and 70 seats, and 223 airplanes with up to 76 seats.

Due to the impacts on travel in 2020, Delta Connection plans to retire the CRJ200 fleet by the end of 2023, after the majority of aircraft were parked during 2020.

As of September 2022, Delta Connection operates the following aircraft:

Historical regional jet fleet
The Delta Connection brand, through its various regional and commuter airline partners, operated a variety of jet aircraft over the years including the following types:

 BAe 146-200
 Bombardier CRJ100
 Dornier 328JET
 Embraer ERJ135
 Embraer ERJ145

Historical turboprop fleet
The Delta Connection brand, through its various regional and commuter airline partners, operated a variety of twin turboprop aircraft over the years including the following types:

 ATR 72
 BAe Jetstream 41
 Beechcraft 1900C
 Beechcraft 1900D
 de Havilland Canada Dash 8-100
 Embraer EMB 110
 Embraer EMB 120
 Fairchild Swearingen Metroliner
 Saab 340

Academy

Delta Connection Academy was an airline flight school established in October 1989. The academy was located in Sanford, Florida on the grounds of the Orlando Sanford International Airport. It contained a fleet that had 73 aircraft and over 550 flight students who attended the academy. On January 13, 2010, it was acquired by Flight Training Acquisitions for $50 million. Today, it operates as L3Harris Flight Academy.

Incidents and accidents
 January 15, 1987: SkyWest Airlines Flight 1834 a Fairchild Metro collided with a Mooney M20 transporting an instructor and a student, while on a flight between Pocatello to Salt Lake City in the vicinity of Kearns, Utah. All eight people on Flight 1834 and the two occupants of the Mooney were killed. The accident was found to be a navigation error of the student pilot aboard the Mooney.
 On February 1, 1991, SkyWest Flight 5569, a Fairchild Swearingen Metroliner, was waiting for takeoff clearance on a runway at LAX when USAir Flight 1493 collided with it. The ten passengers and two crew members onboard Flight 5569 were killed as well as twenty-three passengers and crew on USAir Flight 1493. The crash was blamed on the Air Traffic Controller who allowed the USAir plane to land on the same runway that the SkyWest flight was using.
 On April 5, 1991, Atlantic Southeast Airlines Flight 2311, an Embraer EMB 120, crashed on approach to the Glynco Jetport serving Brunswick, GA. Twenty passengers and three crew members on board all died in the crash. The cause of the crash was an engine malfunction coupled with crew fatigue.
 On August 21, 1995, Atlantic Southeast Airlines Flight 529, an Embraer EMB 120, crashed in the community of Burwell, which is located between the cities of Bowdon, Georgia and  Carrollton, Georgia. Officials determined that a propeller blade loss and inability to feather the remaining blades caused the accident, which killed 8 of the 28 passengers and crew on board.
 On January 9, 1997, Comair Flight 3272, an Embraer EMB 120, crashed near Monroe, Michigan. The flight, which originated from Cincinnati, Ohio, was on approach to Detroit. All 29 passengers and crew were killed when the plane crashed 18 miles from the airport. The cause is listed to be the "FAA's failure to establish adequate aircraft certification standards for flight in icing conditions, the FAA's failure to ensure that an FAA/CTA-approved procedure for the accident airplane's deice system operation was implemented by U.S.-based air carriers, and the FAA's failure to require the establishment of adequate minimum airspeeds for icing conditions."
 On August 27, 2006, Comair Flight 5191, a Bombardier CRJ100, crashed on takeoff at Lexington, Kentucky's Blue Grass Airport, with 47 passengers and three crew members on board. Only the First Officer survived. The pilots took off from the wrong runway, which was not long enough for the aircraft.

References 

Delta Air Lines
Northwest Airlines
Regional airline brands
SkyTeam affiliate members
Regional airlines of the United States
Airlines established in 1984